Temptation of an Angel (also known as Angel's Temptation) is a 2009 SBS television series starring Bae Soo-bin, Lee So-yeon, Jin Tae-hyun and Hong Soo-hyun. It was a male version of another series, Temptation of Wife. Bae Soo-bin and Lee So-yeon reunited onscreen on the MBC television series Dong Yi, less than a year after the show ended. Views exceeded in Korea 23.6٪

Synopsis
Joo Ah-Ran and Shin Hyun-Woo have an elaborate wedding at a luxurious hotel. Shin Hyun-Woo sincerely loves Joo Ah-Ran, but Joo Ah-Ran has ulterior motives for the marriage. Joo Ah-Rans family was destroyed by Shin Hyun-Woo's parents and, because of this, she is marrying Shin Hyun-Woo in a secret plan to exact revenge.

Sometime after their marriage, Shin Hyun-Woo is involved in a horrible car accident, leaving him in a coma. Once Shin Hyun-Woo awakes from his coma he learns of Joo Ah-Ran's revenge plot and then sets out on his own path for revenge....

Cast
 Lee So-yeon as Joo Ah-ran
Wife of Shin Hyun-woo. A furniture designer who married the son of Soul Furniture's owners. She once had an ordinary and happy childhood. But when she lost her parents, she became orphan who went through life's hardships. To avenge her parents' death, she got herself married into the family she believed have led to her parents' death. Growing up as an orphan, she devised a plan to make Hyun-woo fall for her and manipulating him into marrying her as his wife. She started destroying her husband's family thereafter. Ah-ran possesses extreme tenacity and fast thinking. Despite the loss of her parents, she still has an aunt and uncle and even a sister who was put up for adoption.
 Han Sang-jin as Shin Hyun-woo (before plastic surgery)
He was the chief of design department in Soul Furniture, a furniture company owned by his parents. He has soft personality. He's a sweetheart with a romantic sense. Despite his family's objections, Hyun-woo married the woman of his dreams, Ah-ran. His life changed after he was betrayed by the very woman he loved, which led him to a horrific car accident that altered his life forever.
 Bae Soo-bin as Shin Hyun-woo/Ahn Jae-sung (after plastic surgery) - After regaining consciousness, he became totally different person, vowing revenge to his wife. Undergoing plastic surgery, he became a physically attractive man, possessing an image of both an angel and a demon.
 Jin Tae-hyun as Nam Joo-seung - Joo Ah-ran's lover. He is a person who has secrets of his own. Joo-seung works as a doctor during the day and works as a lounge singer at a jazz café at night. His father was the secretary of Mr. Shin, who the younger Nam now works for as the family doctor. He has no physical prowess, but has a strong eyesight, in addition to having a very strong charisma.
 Hong Soo-hyun as Yoon Jae-hee/Joo Kyeong-ran
 Park Ha-young as young Jae-hee
She grew up not knowing who her parents are. She has a bright and optimistic viewpoint on the world. As a child, she dreamed of becoming a nurse who takes care of the poor. Even when she was growing up in the orphanage, she took care of younger children like a big sister. Rather than thinking she was abandoned by her real parents, she believed that it was enough that she was given the love and care from the people of the orphanage. Little did she know that her real parents have died and her sister is still alive, which turns out to be Joo Ah-ran .
 Jung Gyu-su as Joo Ah-ran's father
 Kang Yu-mi as Kim Yeon-jae
 Han Jin-hee as Shin Woo-sub
 Cha Hwa-yeon as Jo Kyung-hee
 Kim Dong-keon as Shin Hyun-min
 Jin Ye-sol as Shin Hyun-ji
 Sung Chang-hoon as Secretary Kang
 Choi Ji-na as Jung Sang-ah / Julie Jung
 Lee Jong-hyuk as Jung Sang-mo
 Lee Mi-young as Jae-hee's aunt
 Jung Gyu-soo as Jae-hee's uncle
 Ahn Nae-sang as detective (eps. 15-16)
 Oh Dae-gyu as fake Hyun-woo (ep. 15)
 Lee Jae-hwang as An Jae-sung  (cameo)
 Kim Ho-chang as the journalist
 Lee Sol-gu as the money lender
 Son Hyun-joo
 Kim Sung-oh

Ratings

Awards
2009 SBS Drama Awards
 Best Supporting Actress in a Special Planning Drama: Cha Hwa-yeon
 New Star Award: Lee So-yeon

Notes
This was considered by many as a "male version" of SBS' top-rating primetime daily drama, Temptation of Wife.

References

External links
 Official SBS Website
 

Seoul Broadcasting System television dramas
2009 South Korean television series debuts
2009 South Korean television series endings
Korean-language television shows
South Korean melodrama television series
South Korean suspense television series
Television series by Samhwa Networks
Television shows written by Kim Soon-ok